The 2014–15 season was Norwich City Football Club's 113th season as a professional club. It was their first season back in the Football League Championship after their relegation from the Premier League in the 2013–14 season. Neil Adams began the season as manager, to embark on a first full season in charge, however this was not to be as he was replaced by Alex Neil in January 2015. Norwich started the League Cup in the second round and exited in the third round following a defeat at League Two side Shrewsbury Town, and were also eliminated in the FA Cup Third Round, following a defeat by Preston North End. Norwich finished third in the regular Championship season, qualifying for the play-offs. They were promoted back to the Premier League after a single season's absence by defeating Middlesbrough 2–0 in the play-off final.

Build up to the season

Finishing eighteenth in the Premier League the previous season resulted in relegation to the Championship.  The Norwich City board announced shortly after relegation was confirmed on 11 May 2014 that a new manager would be announced within the week.  On 22 May 2014 Neil Adams was named as the permanent manager despite the relegation from this season and four defeats in five matches as caretaker manager.  The upheaval at the club was not limited to change in the management team with a number of first team players being linked to moves away from Carrow Road including Robert Snodgrass, Gary Hooper and John Ruddy.  Chairman Alan Bowkett responded to the reports by stating that the club would be under no pressure to sell players during the transfer window.

On 2 June 2014 Norwich named under-21 coach Mark Robson and former player Gary Holt first team coaches.  They also named former player and Ipswich Town manager Joe Royle as football consultant who left the club before the season started.

Norwich went into the season as one of the favourites for promotion with odds of 3/1 for promotion and 10/1 for winning the championship title.

Transfers

Transfers in

Norwich started their summer transfer window dealings by signing striker Lewis Grabban from AFC Bournemouth on 5 June.  They continued their revamp of their attacking options by signing Kyle Lafferty from 2013–14 Serie B champions Palermo on 27 June with the deal being effective from 1 July.  On 5 August Norwich announced the signing of former QPR midfielder Gary O'Neil following his release at the end of the previous season.  On 20 August it was announced that Carlos Cuellar had signed a one-year deal following his release from Sunderland at the end of the previous season and that Cameron Jerome had signed from Stoke City on a three-year deal for an undisclosed fee.  On 27 August Norwich continued their summer transfer spending by signing 17-year-old Falkirk midfielder Conor McGrandles for a fee reported to be worth a total of £1,000,000 after add-ons.  On 29 August Norwich signed Club Brugge midfielder Vadis Odjidja-Ofoe for an undisclosed fee.  On transfer deadline day Norwich signed Arsenal's Spanish defender Ignasi Miquel and Swindon Town defender Louis Thompson for both an undisclosed fee on a three-year deal.

Transfers out
Players David Fox and Carlo Nash were allowed to leave following the end of their contracts while Johan Elmander, Joseph Yobo and Jonás Gutiérrez all returned to their parent clubs following the end of their loan periods.  The first major departure following Norwich's relegation was the sale of Scotland international Robert Snodgrass to Hull for a fee reported to be in the region of £7,000,000 on 30 June 2014.  Anthony Pilkington was the next to leave, joining promotion rivals Cardiff City for a reported fee of £1,000,000 on 15 August.  Newly promoted Queens Park Rangers completed the transfer of Leroy Fer for a reported fee of £8,000,000 on 20 August.  Transfer deadline day saw midfielder Andrew Surman return to Bournemouth for an undisclosed fee.

Loaned In

On transfer deadline day Norwich signed Jos Hooiveld on a season long loan from Southampton.

Loaned out

Oxford United signed 2013 FA Youth Cup winner Carlton Morris on a half-season loan deal on 4 August 2014.  On 5 August club record signing Ricky van Wolfswinkel was allowed to leave on a season long loan to French sign AS Saint-Étienne.  On transfer deadline day Luciano Becchio was loaned to Rotherham until January.

Pre-season matches
Norwich started their pre-season on 12 July 2014 with a 1–0 away win at Isthmian League side Dereham Town with new signing Kyle Lafferty scoring the only goal of the game.  They continued on 15 July 2014 with an emphatic 6–1 away win at Conference Premier side Braintree Town with goals from Andrew Surman, Kyle Lafferty, Nathan Redmond, Bradley Johnson and two from Ricky van Wolfswinkel.  They then started their pre-season tour of Italy by beating an Aosta regional select side 0–13 on 20 July 2014.  The match was initially credited as being against Serie D side S.C. Vallée d'Aoste but following a complaint from their opponents Norwich added a correction to their match report which blamed the error to the late nature to the arrangement of the fixture.  The matches on 20 July 2014 was initially announced to be played against Novara before they pulled out of the fixtures.  A game on 23 July 2014 was initially due to be played against Sampdoria and then Livorno before both teams pulled out of the fixtures.  They finished their tour of Italy with a final game against SC Bastia on 25 July 2014 with Anthony Pilkington scoring late on to snatch a draw.  Norwich returned to Norfolk to play their first home pre-season game at against OGC Nice on 28 July 2014 where goals from Nathan Redmond, Lewis Grabban, Bradley Johnson, Andrew Surman and Elliott Bennett saw them win 5–1.  They concluded their pre-season with a game at Carrow Road against Celta Vigo on 1 August 2014.

Championship Season

August
Norwich started their first season back in the Championship with a defeat at newly promoted Wolverhampton Wanderers by a single goal from David Edwards.  Martin Olsson was sent off for two yellow cards during the game and accepted a charge of misconduct for an apparent push on referee Simon Hooper.  The first home game of the season was a home fixture against Watford. The away team had Joel Ekstrand sent off after three minutes and goals from Johnson, Grabban and Tettey saw Norwich finish the game with a convincing 3–0 win. Their second home game in four days saw Tom Cairney score for Blackburn after 49 seconds but two goals from Lewis Grabban and one from Bradley Johnson saw them end up 3–1 winners.  They followed that up with a victory in their first East Anglian derby since their 5–1 win Portman Road in April 2011.  Lewis Grabban scored the only goal in the game which was his fourth goal in three games.  Grabban continued his run of scoring by scoring against his former club Bournemouth in the following match but Norwich had to settle for a draw following Callum Wilson's equaliser.

September

Following the break for the international matches Norwich resumed their league campaign in an away fixture at Cardiff City.  First half goals from Joe Ralls and Aron Gunnarson saw Cardiff lead 2–0 at half time but second half goals from Olsson, Hoolahan, Turner and Jerome saw Norwich finish 2–4 winners.  The result saw Norwich win the League Managers Association performance of the week award. The following Tuesday saw Norwich travel to a Brentford side who were sixth in the league.  After a tight first half finished without a goal Norwich scored three goals in fifteen minutes to go top of the table.  The following game at home to Birmingham City saw Norwich come back from a two-goal deficit for the second time within a week.  Two goals from Cameron Jerome saw the game finish in a draw.  Norwich's next game saw them travel to struggling Blackpool where they conceded the first goal shortly after half time but Norwich scored three second half goals to ensure they came from behind for the third time in four matches and also saw them return to the top of the table.  Norwich returned to Carrow Road for the following fixture against Charlton Athletic.  Despite dominating the game, with fifteen shots to Charlton's four, Charlton won the game with a late winner.

October

Norwich saw their run of home games without a win stretch to four when they drew to newly promoted Rotherham at Carrow Road.  Rotherham took the lead when a late first half penalty was scored by Paul Green.  Cameron Jerome equalised in the second half to earn a point for Norwich.  Despite the draw results elsewhere meant that they went into the international break top of the league.  Norwich went into the fixture against Fulham having not beaten them since 1986.  In the end a single first half goal from Fulham was enough to settle the matter.  The following midweek fixture at home to Leeds saw Norwich score the first goal of the game for the first time since the Brentford fixture. The lead lasted only four minutes though and the game finished in a draw.  The following match at Sheffield Wednesday finished in a draw and took the poor run of form to five games.  The scoreless first half meant that Norwich hadn't scored a first half goal since the end of August, a run of ten league and cup fixtures.  That run of games without a first half goal came to an end in the twelfth minute of their victory at home to Bolton Wanderers.

November

Norwich travelled to Middlesbrough for a midweek fixture at the Riverside Stadium but came away from a match they were never really in contention in with nothing.  Middlesbrough scored four goals, the first of which was after only five minutes.  Their run of poor form continued when they travelled to Nottingham Forest and conceded two late goals to lose the match 2–1.  It was Nottingham Forest's first victory in ten matches.

December

January

February

March

Norwich's win over rivals Ipswich Town saw a new all seater stadium record of 27,005 set for Carrow Road.  Norwich went on to win the game two goals to nil after goals from Bradley Johnson and Lewis Grabban.  It was their fourth East Anglian Derby win in succession.

April

May

Play-Offs

League table

Results summary

Results by matchday

FA Cup

Norwich started their FA cup campaign in the third round of the competition, against Preston North End FC. This proved to be their only game in the competition, as Norwich lost 2–0 at Preston, failing to register a shot on target in the match.

League Cup
 

Norwich will start their league cup campaign in the second round of the competition at home against Crawley Town.  In their first ever competitive meeting Norwich City won the match 3−1 with two goals from Josh Murphy and one from Cameron Jerome on his début.  Norwich City academy products Kyle Callan-McFadden, who started the match, and Reece Hall-Johnson, who came on as a substitute, both made their professional débuts within the match.  Norwich started their third round match against Shrewsbury Town having made eleven changes from the side that played against Birmingham City the previous Saturday.  They lost to a single goal from James Collins.

Statistics

Overall competition record
Last updated: 26 May 2015
Sources:

Appearances, goals and cards
Last updated: 26 May 2015
Sources:

Goalscorers

Awards
 The Norwich City F.C. Player of the Season was awarded to Bradley Johnson, with Wes Hoolahan and Cameron Jerome in 2nd and 3rd place respectively.
 LMA Performance of the week award - Awarded following the second half comeback away at Cardiff City on 13 September 2014.
 Alex Neil awarded Football League Championship Manager of the Month for February 2015.

See also
List of Norwich City F.C. seasons

References

Norwich City F.C. seasons
Norwich City